

Betulaceae
Alnus   
Alnus glutinosa   
Alnus glutinosa subsp. antitaurica    
Alnus glutinosa subsp. barbata   
Alnus glutinosa subsp. betuloides   
Alnus glutinosa subsp. glutinosa   
Alnus orientalis   
Alnus orientalis var. orientalis  
Alnus orientalis var. pubescens   
Betula   
Betula browiczana    
Betula litwinowii   
Betula medwediewii   
Betula pendula   
Betula recurvata    
Carpinus   
Carpinus betulus   
Carpinus orientalis   
Carpinus orientalis subsp. orientalis   
Corylus   
Corylus avellana   
Corylus avellana var. avellana   
Corylus avellana var. pontica   
Corylus colurna   
Corylus maxima   
Ostrya   
Ostrya carpinifolia

Images

External links

Flora of Turkey